The 1945 VFL season was the 49th season of the Victorian Football League (VFL), the highest level senior Australian rules football competition in Victoria. The season featured twelve clubs, ran from 21 April until 29 September, and comprised a 20-game home-and-away season followed by a finals series featuring the top four clubs.

The premiership was won by the Carlton Football Club for the seventh time, after it defeated  by 28 points in the 1945 VFL Grand Final.

Premiership season
In 1945, the VFL competition consisted of twelve teams of 18 on-the-field players each, plus one substitute player, known as the 19th man. A player could be substituted for any reason; however, once substituted, a player could not return to the field of play under any circumstances.

Teams played each other in a home-and-away season of 20 rounds; matches 12 to 20 were the "home-and-way reverse" of matches 1 to 9.

The determination of the 1945 season's fixtures were greatly complicated by the fact that both the Melbourne Cricket Ground and the Lake Oval were appropriated for military use and, because of this, Melbourne shared the Punt Road Oval with Richmond as their home ground, and South Melbourne shared the Junction Oval with St Kilda as their home ground.

Once the 20 round home-and-away season had finished, the 1945 VFL Premiers were determined by the specific format and conventions of the Page–McIntyre system.

Round 1

|- bgcolor="#CCCCFF"
| Home team
| Home team score
| Away team
| Away team score
| Venue
| Crowd
| Date
|- bgcolor="#FFFFFF"
| 
| 10.17 (77)
| 
| 17.16 (118)
| Junction Oval
| 17,000
| 21 April 1945
|- bgcolor="#FFFFFF"
| 
| 22.18 (150)
| 
| 12.7 (79)
| Windy Hill
| 11,000
| 21 April 1945
|- bgcolor="#FFFFFF"
| 
| 13.13 (91)
| 
| 10.10 (70)
| Victoria Park
| 13,000
| 21 April 1945
|- bgcolor="#FFFFFF"
| 
| 13.9 (87)
| 
| 15.18 (108)
| Princes Park
| 16,000
| 21 April 1945
|- bgcolor="#FFFFFF"
| 
| 14.11 (95)
| 
| 16.9 (105)
| Punt Road Oval
| 24,000
| 21 April 1945
|- bgcolor="#FFFFFF"
| 
| 10.8 (68)
| 
| 15.16 (106)
| Kardinia Park
| 10,000
| 21 April 1945

Round 2

|- bgcolor="#CCCCFF"
| Home team
| Home team score
| Away team
| Away team score
| Venue
| Crowd
| Date
|- bgcolor="#FFFFFF"
| 
| 7.18 (60)
| 
| 8.17 (65)
| Arden Street Oval
| 11,500
| 28 April 1945
|- bgcolor="#FFFFFF"
| 
| 17.16 (118)
| 
| 7.7 (49)
| Punt Road Oval
| 8,000
| 28 April 1945
|- bgcolor="#FFFFFF"
| 
| 18.9 (117)
| 
| 12.9 (81)
| Western Oval
| 11,500
| 28 April 1945
|- bgcolor="#FFFFFF"
| 
| 8.16 (64)
| 
| 9.10 (64)
| Brunswick Street Oval
| 19,000
| 28 April 1945
|- bgcolor="#FFFFFF"
| 
| 12.14 (86)
| 
| 11.10 (76)
| Junction Oval
| 19,000
| 28 April 1945
|- bgcolor="#FFFFFF"
| 
| 16.10 (106)
| 
| 9.18 (72)
| Glenferrie Oval
| 11,000
| 28 April 1945

Round 3

|- bgcolor="#CCCCFF"
| Home team
| Home team score
| Away team
| Away team score
| Venue
| Crowd
| Date
|- bgcolor="#FFFFFF"
| 
| 13.11 (89)
| 
| 15.19 (109)
| Punt Road Oval
| 27,000
| 5 May 1945
|- bgcolor="#FFFFFF"
| 
| 12.9 (81)
| 
| 14.14 (98)
| Brunswick Street Oval
| 20,000
| 5 May 1945
|- bgcolor="#FFFFFF"
| 
| 10.21 (81)
| 
| 11.12 (78)
| Victoria Park
| 12,000
| 5 May 1945
|- bgcolor="#FFFFFF"
| 
| 15.10 (100)
| 
| 11.13 (79)
| Junction Oval
| 10,000
| 5 May 1945
|- bgcolor="#FFFFFF"
| 
| 14.15 (99)
| 
| 10.15 (75)
| Arden Street Oval
| 6,000
| 5 May 1945
|- bgcolor="#FFFFFF"
| 
| 22.18 (150)
| 
| 7.8 (50)
| Windy Hill
| 16,000
| 5 May 1945

Round 4

|- bgcolor="#CCCCFF"
| Home team
| Home team score
| Away team
| Away team score
| Venue
| Crowd
| Date
|- bgcolor="#FFFFFF"
| 
| 9.11 (65)
| 
| 13.7 (85)
| Punt Road Oval
| 23,000
| 12 May 1945
|- bgcolor="#FFFFFF"
| 
| 9.13 (67)
| 
| 10.23 (83)
| Kardinia Park
| 10,500
| 12 May 1945
|- bgcolor="#FFFFFF"
| 
| 11.13 (79)
| 
| 14.8 (92)
| Western Oval
| 15,000
| 12 May 1945
|- bgcolor="#FFFFFF"
| 
| 13.23 (101)
| 
| 9.9 (63)
| Victoria Park
| 11,000
| 12 May 1945
|- bgcolor="#FFFFFF"
| 
| 12.12 (84)
| 
| 11.11 (77)
| Princes Park
| 12,000
| 12 May 1945
|- bgcolor="#FFFFFF"
| 
| 14.17 (101)
| 
| 23.18 (156)
| Junction Oval
| 12,000
| 12 May 1945

Round 5

|- bgcolor="#CCCCFF"
| Home team
| Home team score
| Away team
| Away team score
| Venue
| Crowd
| Date
|- bgcolor="#FFFFFF"
| 
| 15.7 (97)
| 
| 20.11 (131)
| Glenferrie Oval
| 13,000
| 19 May 1945
|- bgcolor="#FFFFFF"
| 
| 11.10 (76)
| 
| 13.14 (92)
| Brunswick Street Oval
| 14,000
| 19 May 1945
|- bgcolor="#FFFFFF"
| 
| 12.18 (90)
| 
| 11.13 (79)
| Princes Park
| 11,000
| 19 May 1945
|- bgcolor="#FFFFFF"
| 
| 18.12 (120)
| 
| 15.10 (100)
| Punt Road Oval
| 7,000
| 19 May 1945
|- bgcolor="#FFFFFF"
| 
| 15.9 (99)
| 
| 12.11 (83)
| Junction Oval
| 30,000
| 19 May 1945
|- bgcolor="#FFFFFF"
| 
| 12.16 (88)
| 
| 11.21 (87)
| Windy Hill
| 17,000
| 19 May 1945

Round 6

|- bgcolor="#CCCCFF"
| Home team
| Home team score
| Away team
| Away team score
| Venue
| Crowd
| Date
|- bgcolor="#FFFFFF"
| 
| 9.12 (66)
| 
| 8.10 (58)
| Arden Street Oval
| 25,000
| 26 May 1945
|- bgcolor="#FFFFFF"
| 
| 10.16 (76)
| 
| 10.8 (68)
| Kardinia Park
| 10,000
| 26 May 1945
|- bgcolor="#FFFFFF"
| 
| 11.16 (82)
| 
| 7.13 (55)
| Western Oval
| 13,000
| 26 May 1945
|- bgcolor="#FFFFFF"
| 
| 8.20 (68)
| 
| 12.21 (93)
| Junction Oval
| 10,000
| 26 May 1945
|- bgcolor="#FFFFFF"
| 
| 12.11 (83)
| 
| 9.17 (71)
| Punt Road Oval
| 28,000
| 26 May 1945
|- bgcolor="#FFFFFF"
| 
| 15.18 (108)
| 
| 12.11 (83)
| Victoria Park
| 18,000
| 26 May 1945

Round 7

|- bgcolor="#CCCCFF"
| Home team
| Home team score
| Away team
| Away team score
| Venue
| Crowd
| Date
|- bgcolor="#FFFFFF"
| 
| 10.12 (72)
| 
| 18.11 (119)
| Punt Road Oval
| 14,000
| 2 June 1945
|- bgcolor="#FFFFFF"
| 
| 7.23 (65)
| 
| 10.15 (75)
| Brunswick Street Oval
| 19,000
| 2 June 1945
|- bgcolor="#FFFFFF"
| 
| 14.28 (112)
| 
| 9.10 (64)
| Windy Hill
| 8,000
| 2 June 1945
|- bgcolor="#FFFFFF"
| 
| 12.17 (89)
| 
| 13.16 (94)
| Princes Park
| 21,000
| 2 June 1945
|- bgcolor="#FFFFFF"
| 
| 11.15 (81)
| 
| 17.14 (116)
| Glenferrie Oval
| 10,000
| 2 June 1945
|- bgcolor="#FFFFFF"
| 
| 7.12 (54)
| 
| 19.16 (130)
| Junction Oval
| 12,000
| 2 June 1945

Round 8

|- bgcolor="#CCCCFF"
| Home team
| Home team score
| Away team
| Away team score
| Venue
| Crowd
| Date
|- bgcolor="#FFFFFF"
| 
| 16.15 (111)
| 
| 13.6 (84)
| Punt Road Oval
| 15,000
| 9 June 1945
|- bgcolor="#FFFFFF"
| 
| 12.16 (88)
| 
| 9.4 (58)
| Junction Oval
| 18,000
| 9 June 1945
|- bgcolor="#FFFFFF"
| 
| 16.10 (106)
| 
| 10.8 (68)
| Arden Street Oval
| 7,000
| 9 June 1945
|- bgcolor="#FFFFFF"
| 
| 12.15 (87)
| 
| 7.14 (56)
| Western Oval
| 23,000
| 9 June 1945
|- bgcolor="#FFFFFF"
| 
| 23.15 (153)
| 
| 8.10 (58)
| Brunswick Street Oval
| 20,000
| 9 June 1945
|- bgcolor="#FFFFFF"
| 
| 10.9 (69)
| 
| 14.21 (105)
| Kardinia Park
| 11,000
| 9 June 1945

Round 9

|- bgcolor="#CCCCFF"
| Home team
| Home team score
| Away team
| Away team score
| Venue
| Crowd
| Date
|- bgcolor="#FFFFFF"
| 
| 12.10 (82)
| 
| 20.10 (130)
| Glenferrie Oval
| 13,000
| 16 June 1945
|- bgcolor="#FFFFFF"
| 
| 12.20 (92)
| 
| 18.14 (122)
| Windy Hill
| 20,000
| 16 June 1945
|- bgcolor="#FFFFFF"
| 
| 13.12 (90)
| 
| 8.13 (61)
| Victoria Park
| 20,000
| 16 June 1945
|- bgcolor="#FFFFFF"
| 
| 11.11 (77)
| 
| 11.20 (86)
| Princes Park
| 20,000
| 16 June 1945
|- bgcolor="#FFFFFF"
| 
| 14.17 (101)
| 
| 14.12 (96)
| Junction Oval
| 7,000
| 16 June 1945
|- bgcolor="#FFFFFF"
| 
| 11.15 (81)
| 
| 14.17 (101)
| Punt Road Oval
| 13,000
| 16 June 1945

Round 10

|- bgcolor="#CCCCFF"
| Home team
| Home team score
| Away team
| Away team score
| Venue
| Crowd
| Date
|- bgcolor="#FFFFFF"
| 
| 16.15 (111)
| 
| 7.6 (48)
| Western Oval
| 9,000
| 23 June 1945
|- bgcolor="#FFFFFF"
| 
| 12.14 (86)
| 
| 13.11 (89)
| Brunswick Street Oval
| 18,000
| 23 June 1945
|- bgcolor="#FFFFFF"
| 
| 15.14 (104)
| 
| 12.14 (86)
| Punt Road Oval
| 6,000
| 23 June 1945
|- bgcolor="#FFFFFF"
| 
| 12.15 (87)
| 
| 5.11 (41)
| Junction Oval
| 22,000
| 23 June 1945
|- bgcolor="#FFFFFF"
| 
| 7.5 (47)
| 
| 21.18 (144)
| Kardinia Park
| 9,000
| 23 June 1945
|- bgcolor="#FFFFFF"
| 
| 7.17 (59)
| 
| 12.12 (84)
| Arden Street Oval
| 15,000
| 23 June 1945

Round 11

|- bgcolor="#CCCCFF"
| Home team
| Home team score
| Away team
| Away team score
| Venue
| Crowd
| Date
|- bgcolor="#FFFFFF"
| 
| 7.12 (54)
| 
| 9.14 (68)
| Windy Hill
| 8,000
| 30 June 1945
|- bgcolor="#FFFFFF"
| 
| 9.10 (64)
| 
| 10.9 (69)
| Victoria Park
| 19,000
| 30 June 1945
|- bgcolor="#FFFFFF"
| 
| 8.8 (56)
| 
| 7.8 (50)
| Princes Park
| 25,500
| 30 June 1945
|- bgcolor="#FFFFFF"
| 
| 6.15 (51)
| 
| 6.21 (57)
| Junction Oval
| 7,500
| 30 June 1945
|- bgcolor="#FFFFFF"
| 
| 14.28 (112)
| 
| 8.8 (56)
| Punt Road Oval
| 11,000
| 30 June 1945
|- bgcolor="#FFFFFF"
| 
| 7.8 (50)
| 
| 10.15 (75)
| Glenferrie Oval
| 7,500
| 30 June 1945

Round 12

|- bgcolor="#CCCCFF"
| Home team
| Home team score
| Away team
| Away team score
| Venue
| Crowd
| Date
|- bgcolor="#FFFFFF"
| 
| 15.12 (102)
| 
| 11.8 (74)
| Western Oval
| 17,000
| 7 July 1945
|- bgcolor="#FFFFFF"
| 
| 17.27 (129)
| 
| 4.9 (33)
| Brunswick Street Oval
| 7,000
| 7 July 1945
|- bgcolor="#FFFFFF"
| 
| 14.22 (106)
| 
| 6.14 (50)
| Junction Oval
| 9,000
| 7 July 1945
|- bgcolor="#FFFFFF"
| 
| 15.17 (107)
| 
| 7.12 (54)
| Glenferrie Oval
| 5,500
| 7 July 1945
|- bgcolor="#FFFFFF"
| 
| 11.11 (77)
| 
| 13.5 (83)
| Arden Street Oval
| 14,000
| 7 July 1945
|- bgcolor="#FFFFFF"
| 
| 12.8 (80)
| 
| 12.9 (81)
| Punt Road Oval
| 16,000
| 7 July 1945

Round 13

|- bgcolor="#CCCCFF"
| Home team
| Home team score
| Away team
| Away team score
| Venue
| Crowd
| Date
|- bgcolor="#FFFFFF"
| 
| 7.14 (56)
| 
| 11.14 (80)
| Windy Hill
| 10,000
| 14 July 1945
|- bgcolor="#FFFFFF"
| 
| 11.14 (80)
| 
| 7.12 (54)
| Victoria Park
| 24,000
| 14 July 1945
|- bgcolor="#FFFFFF"
| 
| 13.12 (90)
| 
| 8.11 (59)
| Princes Park
| 10,000
| 14 July 1945
|- bgcolor="#FFFFFF"
| 
| 18.10 (118)
| 
| 15.9 (99)
| Punt Road Oval
| 21,000
| 14 July 1945
|- bgcolor="#FFFFFF"
| 
| 9.10 (64)
| 
| 10.23 (83)
| Junction Oval
| 6,000
| 14 July 1945
|- bgcolor="#FFFFFF"
| 
| 11.14 (80)
| 
| 13.19 (97)
| Kardinia Park
| 6,000
| 14 July 1945

Round 14

|- bgcolor="#CCCCFF"
| Home team
| Home team score
| Away team
| Away team score
| Venue
| Crowd
| Date
|- bgcolor="#FFFFFF"
| 
| 15.15 (105)
| 
| 13.3 (81)
| Glenferrie Oval
| 5,000
| 21 July 1945
|- bgcolor="#FFFFFF"
| 
| 9.9 (63)
| 
| 13.19 (97)
| Kardinia Park
| 7,500
| 21 July 1945
|- bgcolor="#FFFFFF"
| 
| 11.9 (75)
| 
| 10.18 (78)
| Princes Park
| 14,000
| 21 July 1945
|- bgcolor="#FFFFFF"
| 
| 14.11 (95)
| 
| 10.17 (77)
| Junction Oval
| 32,000
| 21 July 1945
|- bgcolor="#FFFFFF"
| 
| 9.7 (61)
| 
| 8.15 (63)
| Western Oval
| 19,000
| 21 July 1945
|- bgcolor="#FFFFFF"
| 
| 10.17 (77)
| 
| 16.16 (112)
| Punt Road Oval
| 15,000
| 21 July 1945

Round 15

|- bgcolor="#CCCCFF"
| Home team
| Home team score
| Away team
| Away team score
| Venue
| Crowd
| Date
|- bgcolor="#FFFFFF"
| 
| 18.15 (123)
| 
| 3.6 (24)
| Windy Hill
| 5,000
| 28 July 1945
|- bgcolor="#FFFFFF"
| 
| 13.14 (92)
| 
| 11.13 (79)
| Punt Road Oval
| 13,000
| 28 July 1945
|- bgcolor="#FFFFFF"
| 
| 18.27 (135)
| 
| 10.7 (67)
| Junction Oval
| 8,000
| 28 July 1945
|- bgcolor="#FFFFFF"
| 
| 11.7 (73)
| 
| 8.6 (54)
| Arden Street Oval
| 12,000
| 28 July 1945
|- bgcolor="#FFFFFF"
| 
| 9.13 (67)
| 
| 15.9 (99)
| Glenferrie Oval
| 8,000
| 28 July 1945
|- bgcolor="#FFFFFF"
| 
| 7.12 (54)
| 
| 9.4 (58)
| Brunswick Street Oval
| 16,000
| 28 July 1945

Round 16

|- bgcolor="#CCCCFF"
| Home team
| Home team score
| Away team
| Away team score
| Venue
| Crowd
| Date
|- bgcolor="#FFFFFF"
| 
| 7.14 (56)
| 
| 17.13 (115)
| Kardinia Park
| 7,000
| 4 August 1945
|- bgcolor="#FFFFFF"
| 
| 7.13 (55)
| 
| 8.8 (56)
| Western Oval
| 27,000
| 4 August 1945
|- bgcolor="#FFFFFF"
| 
| 16.8 (104)
| 
| 10.15 (75)
| Victoria Park
| 19,000
| 4 August 1945
|- bgcolor="#FFFFFF"
| 
| 15.15 (105)
| 
| 19.7 (121)
| Punt Road Oval
| 13,000
| 4 August 1945
|- bgcolor="#FFFFFF"
| 
| 12.6 (78)
| 
| 4.9 (33)
| Arden Street Oval
| 14,000
| 4 August 1945
|- bgcolor="#FFFFFF"
| 
| 7.15 (57)
| 
| 11.13 (79)
| Junction Oval
| 10,000
| 4 August 1945

Round 17

|- bgcolor="#CCCCFF"
| Home team
| Home team score
| Away team
| Away team score
| Venue
| Crowd
| Date
|- bgcolor="#FFFFFF"
| 
| 17.27 (129)
| 
| 8.14 (62)
| Brunswick Street Oval
| 5,000
| 11 August 1945
|- bgcolor="#FFFFFF"
| 
| 14.22 (106)
| 
| 10.13 (73)
| Windy Hill
| 12,000
| 11 August 1945
|- bgcolor="#FFFFFF"
| 
| 13.11 (89)
| 
| 13.5 (83)
| Princes Park
| 25,000
| 11 August 1945
|- bgcolor="#FFFFFF"
| 
| 21.8 (134)
| 
| 10.16 (76)
| Junction Oval
| 26,000
| 11 August 1945
|- bgcolor="#FFFFFF"
| 
| 14.21 (105)
| 
| 9.13 (67)
| Glenferrie Oval
| 5,500
| 11 August 1945
|- bgcolor="#FFFFFF"
| 
| 12.18 (90)
| 
| 12.9 (81)
| Punt Road Oval
| 12,000
| 11 August 1945

Round 18

|- bgcolor="#CCCCFF"
| Home team
| Home team score
| Away team
| Away team score
| Venue
| Crowd
| Date
|- bgcolor="#FFFFFF"
| 
| 15.15 (105)
| 
| 13.11 (89)
| Western Oval
| 12,000
| 18 August 1945
|- bgcolor="#FFFFFF"
| 
| 17.19 (121)
| 
| 5.12 (42)
| Victoria Park
| 8,000
| 18 August 1945
|- bgcolor="#FFFFFF"
| 
| 11.17 (83)
| 
| 8.10 (58)
| Arden Street Oval
| 8,000
| 18 August 1945
|- bgcolor="#FFFFFF"
| 
| 10.13 (73)
| 
| 11.16 (82)
| Junction Oval
| 20,000
| 18 August 1945
|- bgcolor="#FFFFFF"
| 
| 14.7 (91)
| 
| 16.13 (109)
| Kardinia Park
| 8,500
| 18 August 1945
|- bgcolor="#FFFFFF"
| 
| 12.9 (81)
| 
| 13.15 (93)
| Punt Road Oval
| 38,000
| 18 August 1945

Round 19

|- bgcolor="#CCCCFF"
| Home team
| Home team score
| Away team
| Away team score
| Venue
| Crowd
| Date
|- bgcolor="#FFFFFF"
| 
| 10.13 (73)
| 
| 12.20 (92)
| Punt Road Oval
| 17,000
| 25 August 1945
|- bgcolor="#FFFFFF"
| 
| 11.11 (77)
| 
| 10.10 (70)
| Glenferrie Oval
| 12,000
| 25 August 1945
|- bgcolor="#FFFFFF"
| 
| 15.17 (107)
| 
| 9.13 (67)
| Windy Hill
| 20,000
| 25 August 1945
|- bgcolor="#FFFFFF"
| 
| 16.7 (103)
| 
| 10.17 (77)
| Victoria Park
| 24,000
| 25 August 1945
|- bgcolor="#FFFFFF"
| 
| 23.23 (161)
| 
| 9.13 (67)
| Princes Park
| 9,000
| 25 August 1945
|- bgcolor="#FFFFFF"
| 
| 7.6 (48)
| 
| 13.22 (100)
| Junction Oval
| 8,000
| 25 August 1945

Round 20

|- bgcolor="#CCCCFF"
| Home team
| Home team score
| Away team
| Away team score
| Venue
| Crowd
| Date
|- bgcolor="#FFFFFF"
| 
| 13.14 (92)
| 
| 9.11 (65)
| Kardinia Park
| 7,500
| 1 September 1945
|- bgcolor="#FFFFFF"
| 
| 14.22 (106)
| 
| 15.11 (101)
| Brunswick Street Oval
| 5,000
| 1 September 1945
|- bgcolor="#FFFFFF"
| 
| 16.16 (112)
| 
| 11.10 (76)
| Junction Oval
| 12,000
| 1 September 1945
|- bgcolor="#FFFFFF"
| 
| 14.17 (101)
| 
| 13.17 (95)
| Arden Street Oval
| 12,000
| 1 September 1945
|- bgcolor="#FFFFFF"
| 
| 8.19 (67)
| 
| 12.15 (87)
| Punt Road Oval
| 23,000
| 1 September 1945
|- bgcolor="#FFFFFF"
| 
| 8.14 (62)
| 
| 16.19 (115)
| Western Oval
| 30,000
| 1 September 1945

Ladder

Finals

Semi-finals

|- bgcolor="#CCCCFF"
| Home team
| Score
| Away team
| Score
| Venue
| Crowd
| Date
|- bgcolor="#FFFFFF"
| 
| 8.20 (68)
| 
| 14.10 (94)
| Princes Park
| 54,846
| 8 September
|- bgcolor="#FFFFFF"
| 
| 13.10 (88)
| 
| 11.11 (77)
| Princes Park
| 46,224
| 15 September

Preliminary final

|- bgcolor="#CCCCFF"
| Home team
| Score
| Away team
| Score
| Venue
| Crowd
| Date
|- bgcolor="#FFFFFF"
| 
| 12.8 (80)
| 
| 13.12 (90)
| Princes Park
| 41,305
| 22 September

Grand final

Carlton defeated South Melbourne 15.13 (103) to 10.15 (75), in front of a crowd of 62,986 people. (For an explanation of scoring see Australian rules football).

Awards
 The 1945 VFL Premiership team was Carlton.
 The VFL's leading goalkicker was Fred Fanning of Melbourne with 67 goals.
 No Brownlow Medal was awarded in 1945.
 St Kilda took the "wooden spoon" in 1945.
Footscray 9.16 (70) defeated  9.3 (57) in the Grand Final, played as a stand-alone match on Saturday 22 September at Victoria Park before a crowd of 6,000.

Notable events
 The home-and-away season was expanded to 20 rounds.
 The VFL adopted the "downfield free kick" rule, such that if a player is fouled after disposing of the ball, the free kick is taken at the spot where the ball lands by the nearest team-mate, not at the spot of the foul.
  changed its nickname from Seagulls to Panthers in the 1945 season, after a supporter had presented the club with an oil painting of a panther to be hung in the club rooms. The change never truly caught on, and fell out of common use relatively quickly.
 South Melbourne's captain and Brownlow Medal winner Herbie Matthews and South Melbourne forward Keith Smith were dropped from the Round 13 match by their club for refusing to play in the positions they were directed to play in.
 After its Round 14 loss to Essendon, Carlton won its next nine consecutive matches (including the Grand Final).
 North Melbourne made the finals for the first time since entering the VFL in 1925.  Of the three clubs to enter the league in 1925, only Hawthorn had not yet made the finals, and would not do so until 1957.
 The 1945 second semi-final was South Melbourne's last finals win as "South Melbourne". The club did not play finals again until 1970, and did not win another final until 1996, after it had moved to Sydney – a fifty-one-year gap.
 Carlton's 1945 premiership win was the first time since the Page–McIntyre system had been adopted in 1931 that a team from fourth place on the home-and-away ladder won the Grand Final.
 The Grand Final was held at Princes Park for the last time. It has been held at the MCG every year since, except 1991 and 2020 and 2021.
 The Grand Final, played in extremely wet, muddy conditions, is remembered as "the Bloodbath" for its overall continuous violence (on the field and amongst the fans), and its plethora of crude king hits and brawls (many of which were broken up with the assistance of team officials and the police). The Melbourne tabloid newspaper, The Truth, called it "the most repugnant spectacle League football has ever known", with ten players reported for a total of sixteen offences.

References

 Rogers, S. & Brown, A., Every Game Ever Played: VFL/AFL Results 1897–1997 (Sixth Edition), Viking Books, (Ringwood), 1998. 
 Ross, J. (ed), 100 Years of Australian Football 1897–1996: The Complete Story of the AFL, All the Big Stories, All the Great Pictures, All the Champions, Every AFL Season Reported, Viking, (Ringwood), 1996.

External links
 1945 Season – AFL Tables

Australian Football League seasons
Season